Pud Cusack is an American sound engineer. She was nominated for an Academy Award in the category Best Sound for the film The Mask of Zorro. She has worked on more than 50 films since 1988.

Selected filmography
 The Mask of Zorro (1998)

References

External links

Year of birth missing (living people)
Living people
American audio engineers
Women audio engineers
Production sound mixers